John Bray Ayre (June 18, 1850 – April 20, 1915) was a merchant and political figure in Newfoundland. He represented Bay de Verde in the Newfoundland and Labrador House of Assembly from 1894 to 1897.

He was born in St. John's, the son of Charles R. Ayre. He served as a director in the family firm. Ayre was a member of the Legislative Council of Newfoundland from 1898 to 1915. He died in St. John's at the age of 64.

References 
 

Members of the Newfoundland and Labrador House of Assembly
Members of the Legislative Council of Newfoundland
1850 births
1915 deaths
Newfoundland Colony people
Dominion of Newfoundland politicians